Sherkat-e Nirpars (also Romanized as Sherkat-e Nīrpārs) is a village in Bandar-e Emam Khomeyni Rural District, Bandar-e Emam Khomeyni District, Mahshahr County, Khuzestan Province, Iran. At the 2006 census, its population was 16, in 5 families.

References 

Populated places in Mahshahr County